Golubinjak Vidauct is  viaduct located between the Delnice and Vrata interchanges of the A6 motorway in Gorski Kotar, Croatia. The viaduct is tolled within the A6 motorway ticket system and there are no separate toll plazas associated with use of the viaduct. The viaduct consists of two parallel structures: The first one was completed in 2004, and the second one in 2008. The viaduct was designed by Inženjerski projektni zavod and constructed by Hidroelektra.

Traffic volume
Traffic is regularly counted and reported by Autocesta Rijeka–Zagreb, operator of the viaduct and the A6 motorway where the structure is located, and published by Hrvatske ceste. Substantial variations between annual (AADT) and summer (ASDT) traffic volumes are attributed to the fact that the bridge carries substantial tourist traffic to the Adriatic resorts. The traffic count is performed using analysis of motorway toll ticket sales.

See also
List of bridges by length

References

Plate girder bridges
Bridges completed in 2004
Toll bridges in Croatia
Viaducts in Croatia
Buildings and structures in Primorje-Gorski Kotar County
Transport in Primorje-Gorski Kotar County